Dashtesar District is a district (bakhsh) in Amol county, Mazandaran Province, Iran. Its administrative center is Ejbar Kola. At the 2011 census, its population was 37,032, in 10,825 families. The District has two rural districts (dehestan): Dashtesare gharbi Rural District and Dashtesare sharghi Rural District.

References 

Amol County
Districts of Mazandaran Province